Radomski or Radomsky is a surname. The feminine form in both Polish and Ukrainian is Radomska. Notable people with the surname include:

 Adam S. Radomsky, Canadian psychologist
 Arkadiusz Radomski (born 1977), Polish footballer
 Dale Radomski, American stuntman and actor
 Eric Radomski, American television producer
 Inna Osypenko-Radomska (born 1982), Ukrainian sprint kayaker
 Kerstin Radomski (born 1974), German politician
 Kirk Radomski (born 1969), American money launderer
 Metro Radomsky (1910–1995), Ukrainian-Canadian musician
 Mikołaj Radomski, early 15th century Polish composer
 Paul Radomski (1902–1945), German Nazi concentration camp commander

See also 
 
 
 Radom County (powiat radomski), an administrative division in eastern Poland

Polish-language surnames